Boom Boom Kid is a hardcore band from Argentina. This band has influences of rockabilly, psychobilly and salsa. The group was formed in 2001 by musician Carlos Rodríguez; after the separation of Fun People. The name, "Boom Boom Kid" (hereinafter BBK) ; it is also the stage name of Rodriguez.

Biography 
This solo project starts very record with the last album Fun People Angustia, no, no (2000) where BBK single "Hold me/I Do" was attached.  
Subsequently, the debut LP Okey Dokey (2001) and multiple maxi singles and B-sides and filled with oddities appears, continuing a constant in the singer's career and was continuous and multi-format editing of his work in the case of BBK is entirely edited (in Argentina) by their label Ugly Records, created by Carlos himself.

Subsequently, released their second LP Smiles from Chapanoland (2004) and an album that compiles some singles and B-sides titled The many, many moods of Boom Boom Kid (2005).

In 2009, they released their latest production more recent study, titled Frisbee. As of date, the band has released live materials, EPs, compilations, books and seven-inch singles, etc.

Discography

Studio albums 
 Okey Dokey (2001)
 Smiles from Chapanoland (2004)
 Espontáneos Minutos De 2x2 Es 16 Odas Al Dada Tunes (2007)
 Frisbee (2009)
 El disco del otoño (2017)
 El disco del invierno (2017)
 El disco de la primavera (2017)
 El disco del verano (2018)

Compilations 
 The Many Many Moods Of Boom Boom Kid (2005)
 Colección Verano 2010 (2010)
 Gatiho Preto Maulla 33 Faixas De Pelo Largo (2010)
 Grandfather's Poncho (2010, compilado japonés)
 Muy Frisbee (2011, compilado de outtakes de Frisbee)
 Libro absurdo (2012)
 Demasiado en fiestas, sin timón y con el mono al hombro

Singles (maxisimples/EP) 
 Abrazame/I Do (2001)
 Razones/Kitty / Du Du (2001)
 Jenny/Feliz (2001)
 Can You Hear Me? (2001)
 I Don't Mind (2002)
 Hard - Ons/Boom Boom Kid (Slipt, 2002)
 She Runaway (2004)
 Boom Boom Kid/El Pus (Split 5", 2005)
 Con Amor Para Ricardo Valenzuela (7", 2006)
 Wasabi (2007)
 Sin Sanata Y Con El Tupé De No Callar (Single, 2008)
 Benjui Jamboree (EP, 2009)
 BBkid Y Su Guitarra (2012)

See also 
Argentine punk

References

External links 

Argentine hardcore punk groups
Argentine alternative rock groups
Musical groups established in 2001